Taos Pueblo is a census-designated place (CDP) in Taos County, New Mexico, just north of Taos. The population was 1,264 at the 2000 census.

Geography
Taos Pueblo is located at  (36.448735, -105.553979). Rio Pueblo de Taos passes through Taos Pueblo.

According to the United States Census Bureau, the CDP has a total area of 15.6 square miles (40.5 km), all land.

Culture and history

Taos Pueblo is the only living Native American community designated both a World Heritage Site by UNESCO and a National Historic Landmark.

The multi-storied Taos Pueblo adobe buildings have been continuously inhabited for over 1000 years.

Demographics

As of the census of 2000, there were 1,264 people, 441 households, and 316 families residing in the CDP. The population density was 80.9 people per square mile (31.2/km). There were 682 housing units at an average density of 43.6 per square mile (16.9/km).

The racial makeup of the CDP was 2.93% White, 95.02% Native American, 0.40% Pacific Islander, 0.32% from other races, and 1.34% from two or more races. Hispanic or Latino of any race were 4.11% of the population.

Age
There were 441 households, out of which 29.5% had children under the age of 18 living with them, 39.0% were married couples living together, 20.6% had a female householder with no husband present, and 28.3% were non-families. 25.6% of all households were made up of individuals, and 9.3% had someone living alone who was 65 years of age or older. The average household size was 2.87 and the average family size was 3.39.

In the CDP, the population was spread out, with 26.1% under the age of 18, 8.5% from 18 to 24, 28.8% from 25 to 44, 22.1% from 45 to 64, and 14.5% who were 65 years of age or older. The median age was 36 years. For every 100 females, there were 102.6 males. For every 100 females age 18 and over, there were 103.0 males.

Income
The median income for a household in the CDP was $20,682, and the median income for a family was $23,867. Males had a median income of $19,861 versus $18,333 for females. The per capita income for the CDP was $10,002. About 27.4% of families and 31.6% of the population were below the poverty line, including 36.3% of those under age 18 and 38.0% of those age 65 or over.

Education
It is within Taos Municipal Schools, which operates Taos High School.

The Bureau of Indian Education-operated Taos Day School is in Taos Pueblo.

See also
Ancestral Puebloans
Puebloan peoples

References

External links

Indianpueblo.org—Indian Pueblo Cultural Center: Taos Pueblo
unesco.org: Taos Pueblo — UNESCO World Heritage Centre.

Census-designated places in Taos County, New Mexico
Census-designated places in New Mexico
Taos Pueblo